The following outline is provided as an overview of and topical guide to Bosnia and Herzegovina:

Bosnia and Herzegovina – country in Southwestern Europe, on the Balkan Peninsula. It  comprises two autonomous entities: the Federation of Bosnia and Herzegovina and Republika Srpska, with a third region, the Brčko District, governed under local government. The country is home to three ethnic groups:  Bosniaks are the largest group of the three, with Serbs second and Croats third.

General reference

 Common English country name:  Bosnia and Herzegovina
 Official English country name:  Bosnia and Herzegovina
 Common endonym(s): Bosna i Hercegovina – Босна и Херцеговина
 Official endonym(s): Bosna i Hercegovina – Босна и Херцеговина
 Adjectival(s): Bosnian, Herzegovinian
 Demonym(s):
 Etymology: Name of Bosnia and Herzegovina
 ISO country codes: BA, BIH, 070
 ISO region codes: See ISO 3166-2:BA
 Internet country code top-level domain: .ba

Geography of Bosnia and Herzegovina 

Geography of Bosnia and Herzegovina
 Bosnia and Herzegovina is: a country
 Location:
 Eastern Hemisphere
 Northern Hemisphere
 Eurasia
 Europe
 Southern Europe
 Balkans (also known as "Southeastern Europe")
 Time zone:  Central European Time (UTC+01), Central European Summer Time (UTC+02)
 Extreme points of Bosnia and Herzegovina
 High:  Maglić 
 Low:  Adriatic Sea 0 m
 Land boundaries: 1,538 km
 932 km
 357 km
 249 km
 Coastline:  Adriatic Sea 20 km
 Population of Bosnia and Herzegovina: 3,981,239(2007) - 126th most populous country

 Area of Bosnia and Herzegovina:  - 127th largest country
 Atlas of Bosnia and Herzegovina

Environment of Bosnia and Herzegovina 

 Climate of Bosnia and Herzegovina
 Renewable energy in Bosnia and Herzegovina
 Geology of Bosnia and Herzegovina
 Protected areas of Bosnia and Herzegovina
 Biosphere reserves in Bosnia and Herzegovina
 National parks of Bosnia and Herzegovina
 Wildlife of Bosnia and Herzegovina
 Fauna of Bosnia and Herzegovina
 Birds of Bosnia and Herzegovina
 Mammals of Bosnia and Herzegovina

Natural geographic features of Bosnia and Herzegovina 

 Glaciers of Bosnia and Herzegovina
 Islands of Bosnia and Herzegovina
 Lakes of Bosnia and Herzegovina
 Mountains of Bosnia and Herzegovina
 Volcanoes in Bosnia and Herzegovina
 Rivers of Bosnia and Herzegovina
 World Heritage Sites in Bosnia and Herzegovina

Regions of Bosnia and Herzegovina 

Regions of Bosnia and Herzegovina

Ecoregions of Bosnia and Herzegovina 

List of ecoregions in Bosnia and Herzegovina

Administrative divisions of Bosnia and Herzegovina 

Administrative divisions of Bosnia and Herzegovina
 Municipalities of Bosnia and Herzegovina

Municipalities of Bosnia and Herzegovina 

Municipalities of Bosnia and Herzegovina
 Capital of Bosnia and Herzegovina: Sarajevo
 Cities of Bosnia and Herzegovina

Demography of Bosnia and Herzegovina 

Demographics of Bosnia and Herzegovina

Government and politics of Bosnia and Herzegovina 

Politics of Bosnia and Herzegovina
 Form of government: parliamentary representative democratic republic
 Capital of Bosnia and Herzegovina: Sarajevo
 Elections in Bosnia and Herzegovina
 Political parties in Bosnia and Herzegovina

Branches of government

Government of Bosnia and Herzegovina

Executive branch of the government of Bosnia and Herzegovina 
 Head of state: President of Bosnia and Herzegovina
 Head of government: Prime Minister of Bosnia and Herzegovina
 Cabinet of Bosnia and Herzegovina

Legislative branch of the government of Bosnia and Herzegovina 

 Parliament of Bosnia and Herzegovina (bicameral)
 Upper house: House of Peoples of Bosnia and Herzegovina
 Lower house: House of Representatives of Bosnia and Herzegovina

Judicial branch of the government of Bosnia and Herzegovina 

Court system of Bosnia and Herzegovina
 Supreme Court of Bosnia and Herzegovina

Foreign relations of Bosnia and Herzegovina 

Foreign relations of Bosnia and Herzegovina
 Diplomatic missions in Bosnia and Herzegovina
 Diplomatic missions of Bosnia and Herzegovina

International organization membership 
The government of Bosnia and Herzegovina is a member of:

Bank for International Settlements (BIS)
Central European Initiative (CEI)
Council of Europe (CE)
Euro-Atlantic Partnership Council (EAPC)
European Bank for Reconstruction and Development (EBRD)
Food and Agriculture Organization (FAO)
Group of 77 (G77)
International Atomic Energy Agency (IAEA)
International Bank for Reconstruction and Development (IBRD)
International Civil Aviation Organization (ICAO)
International Criminal Court (ICCt)
International Criminal Police Organization (Interpol)
International Development Association (IDA)
International Federation of Red Cross and Red Crescent Societies (IFRCS)
International Finance Corporation (IFC)
International Fund for Agricultural Development (IFAD)
International Labour Organization (ILO)
International Maritime Organization (IMO)
International Mobile Satellite Organization (IMSO)
International Monetary Fund (IMF)
International Olympic Committee (IOC)
International Organization for Migration (IOM)
International Organization for Standardization (ISO)
International Red Cross and Red Crescent Movement (ICRM)
International Telecommunication Union (ITU)

International Telecommunications Satellite Organization (ITSO)
International Trade Union Confederation (ITUC)
Inter-Parliamentary Union (IPU)
Multilateral Investment Guarantee Agency (MIGA)
Nonaligned Movement (NAM) (observer)
Organisation of Islamic Cooperation (OIC) (observer)
Organization for Security and Cooperation in Europe (OSCE)
Organisation for the Prohibition of Chemical Weapons (OPCW)
Organization of American States (OAS) (observer)
Partnership for Peace (PFP)
Southeast European Cooperative Initiative (SECI)
United Nations (UN)
United Nations Conference on Trade and Development (UNCTAD)
United Nations Educational, Scientific, and Cultural Organization (UNESCO)
United Nations Industrial Development Organization (UNIDO)
United Nations Organization Mission in the Democratic Republic of the Congo (MONUC)
Universal Postal Union (UPU)
World Customs Organization (WCO)
World Federation of Trade Unions (WFTU)
World Health Organization (WHO)
World Intellectual Property Organization (WIPO)
World Meteorological Organization (WMO)
World Tourism Organization (UNWTO)
World Trade Organization (WTO) (observer)

Law and order in Bosnia and Herzegovina 

Law of Bosnia and Herzegovina
 Capital punishment in Bosnia and Herzegovina
 Constitution of Bosnia and Herzegovina
 Crime in Bosnia and Herzegovina
 Human rights in Bosnia and Herzegovina
 LGBT rights in Bosnia and Herzegovina
 Freedom of religion in Bosnia and Herzegovina
 Law enforcement in Bosnia and Herzegovina

Military of Bosnia and Herzegovina 

Military of Bosnia and Herzegovina
 Command
 Commander-in-chief:
 Ministry of Defence of Bosnia and Herzegovina
 Forces
 Army of Bosnia and Herzegovina
 Navy of Bosnia and Herzegovina
 Air Force of Bosnia and Herzegovina
 Special forces of Bosnia and Herzegovina
 Military history of Bosnia and Herzegovina
 Military ranks of Bosnia and Herzegovina

Local government in Bosnia and Herzegovina 

Local government in Bosnia and Herzegovina

History of Bosnia and Herzegovina 

History of Bosnia and Herzegovina
Timeline of the history of Bosnia and Herzegovina
Current events of Bosnia and Herzegovina
 Military history of Bosnia and Herzegovina

Culture of Bosnia and Herzegovina 

Culture of Bosnia and Herzegovina
 Architecture of Bosnia and Herzegovina
 Cuisine of Bosnia and Herzegovina
 Festivals in Bosnia and Herzegovina
 Languages of Bosnia and Herzegovina
 Media in Bosnia and Herzegovina
 National symbols of Bosnia and Herzegovina
 Coat of arms of Bosnia and Herzegovina
 Flag of Bosnia and Herzegovina
 National anthem of Bosnia and Herzegovina
 People of Bosnia and Herzegovina
 Prostitution in Bosnia and Herzegovina
 Public holidays in Bosnia and Herzegovina
 Records of Bosnia and Herzegovina
 Religion in Bosnia and Herzegovina
 Christianity in Bosnia and Herzegovina
 Hinduism in Bosnia and Herzegovina
 Islam in Bosnia and Herzegovina
 Judaism in Bosnia and Herzegovina
 Sikhism in Bosnia and Herzegovina
 World Heritage Sites in Bosnia and Herzegovina

Art in Bosnia and Herzegovina 
 Art in Bosnia and Herzegovina
 Cinema of Bosnia and Herzegovina
 Literature of Bosnia and Herzegovina
 Music of Bosnia and Herzegovina
 Television in Bosnia and Herzegovina
 Theatre in Bosnia and Herzegovina

Sport in Bosnia and Herzegovina 

Sport in Bosnia and Herzegovina
 Football in Bosnia and Herzegovina
 Bosnia and Herzegovina at the Olympics

Economy and infrastructure of Bosnia and Herzegovina 

Economy of Bosnia and Herzegovina
 Economic rank, by nominal GDP (2007): 102nd (one hundred and second)
 Agriculture in Bosnia and Herzegovina
 Banking in Bosnia and Herzegovina
 National bank of Bosnia and Herzegovina
 Communications in Bosnia and Herzegovina
 Internet in Bosnia and Herzegovina
 Companies of Bosnia and Herzegovina
Currency of Bosnia and Herzegovina: Convertible Mark
ISO 4217: BAM
 Energy in Bosnia and Herzegovina
 Energy policy of Bosnia and Herzegovina
 Oil industry in Bosnia and Herzegovina
 Health care in Bosnia and Herzegovina
 Mining in Bosnia and Herzegovina
 Bosnia and Herzegovina Stock Exchange
 Tourism in Bosnia and Herzegovina
 Transport in Bosnia and Herzegovina
 Airports in Bosnia and Herzegovina
 Rail transport in Bosnia and Herzegovina
 Roads in Bosnia and Herzegovina

Education in Bosnia and Herzegovina 

Education in Bosnia and Herzegovina

See also 

 Outline of Slavic history and culture
 List of Slavic studies journals

References

External links 

 
 Government of the Federation of Bosnia and Herzegovina

Bosnia and Herzegovina